Sigma Beta Rho Fraternity, Inc. (also SigRho) is a national, collegiate, multicultural, Greek-lettered fraternity.

History

Founding

The founders originally attended three different college campuses, and came together to form Sigma Beta Rho as a South-Asian Interest fraternity. The first eight members of Sigma Beta Rho, known as the National Founding Fathers, are: 

A formal announcement that Sigma Beta Rho had formed, however, occurred upon the establishment of its Beta chapter at Binghamton University on August 22, 1998. That same year the fraternity incorporated under the State Department of New York. Since 1998, Sigma Beta Rho has expanded to over 60 chapters and colonies in the United States, and has a total membership of over 3,500 brothers.

Organization
The National Executive Board (NEB) is the governing body of Sigma Beta Rho, and presides over the nationwide fraternity, which is divided into eight interim regions. Each region is appointed a Regional Governor (RG) by the NEB, who acts as the envoy to his respective region on the behalf of the NEB. Under each RG, there is also a Regional Advisory Committee (RAC).

The fraternity’s national philanthropic focus is on its partnership with SOS Children's Villages. Sigma Beta Rho is currently working on establishing an internet-based newsletter, the Seven Star Journal.

Sigma Beta Rho is a charter member of the National APIDA Panhellenic Association (NAPA). Sigma Beta Rho member Akash Kuruvilla co-authored the original constitution of NAPA. The fraternity was also accepted into the North American Interfraternity Conference (NIC) on 15 April 2007 as its 69th member organization.

Sigma Beta Rho maintains a non-hazing policy.

Diversification
In its first few years of existence, Sigma Beta Rho changed its focus from a South-Asian interest fraternity to one with a multicultural mission. The fraternity's mission advocates the idea that the United States is a cultural salad bowl, and that members should actively embrace both their own cultural heritage, as well as a work towards a better understanding of the greater community.

Entities
These are the Chapters, Associate Chapters and Colonies of Sigma Beta Rho. When referring to all their campus groups, regardless of type, for convenience, Sigma Beta Rho calls them "entities". These appear to be grades of operation, thus if a chapter falters it may recover and be listed as an Associate Chapter for a period of time until earning the right to call itself a Chapter.  Groups listed in bold are active, while those listed in italics are inactive.

Notes

See also
 List of social fraternities and sororities
 National APIDA Panhellenic Association

References

External links
 

Asian-American culture in Pennsylvania
Student societies in the United States
North American Interfraternity Conference
Student organizations established in 1996
University of Pennsylvania
1996 establishments in Pennsylvania
Asian-American fraternities and sororities